Amirabad (also Romanized as Amīrābād) is a village in Farmahin Rural District, in the Central District of Farahan County, Markazi Province, Iran. At the 2006 census, its population was 954, in 222 families.

References 

Populated places in Farahan County